Batay Ouvriye is a national workers' movement in Haiti known to be active since 1994.

BATAY OUVRIYE is an organization that regroups factory unions and committees, workers’ associations and militants, all struggling in Haiti for the construction of an independent, combative and democratic union movement, and to organize wage-workers, self-employed workers as well as the unemployed for the defense of their rights. The organization is an alternative to the traditional bureaucratic, corrupt union movement that upholds the dominant classes’ power amongst the exploited masses of Haiti. Not only do we take the initiative of developing spontaneous direct issue struggles, but also we incite the working class to fight and to organize themselves to defend their independent interests. Batay Ouvriye also links these particular struggles with those, more wide-ranging, of the people. In this sense, we take part in all types of popular democratic struggles by encouraging the involvement of workers.

Batay Ouvriye entered the struggle against the Disney company and other large multinationals exploiting the workers of the earth. In this struggle, we were able to find the collaboration of various solidarity organizations throughout the world interested in workers’ struggles in general and those of the Haitian workers in particular. Batay Ouvriye representatives participate in various forums organized in protest against the violations and abuses endured by workers all over the world. Lately, we participated, for example:

 in the hemispheric organization of the garment workers of the export free trade zones in the Dominican Republic;
 in debates around organizational strategy in free trade zone countries of Central America, Mexico and the Caribbean;
 in Guatemala, on the gender question in the organizational effort in international subcontracting zones;
 in Belgium, in the Peoples Court reporting against various companies multinational such Adidas, Disney, Levi Strauss, C&A and H&M;
 in the U.S.A., in the conference on «Independent Monitoring» accusing Disney, Nike, Walmart, Keymart;
 and in several informational tours in the struggle against Disney.

For we are aware that in the present context of world capitalist development, Haitian worker struggles cannot be detached from those of all the other workers being led in other countries. We have brought and continue to bring our militant support to all the fights in defense of labor and peoples' democratic rights.

In Haiti, Batay Ouvriye encourages the diffusion of information and workers’ training through conferences and debates, seminars or labor training workshops, by preparing and distributing didactic material on workers’ rights, international labor conventions and appropriate struggle strategies in order to thwart local or foreign bosses.

Our interventions touch upon:

1) The non-respect of workers’ union rights, notably the right to unionize and the right to collective negotiation;

2) The need to increase the minimum daily wage, while insisting on the right of the workers to have a salary that takes into account the cost of life and the continuous devaluation of the gourd, our national currency;

3) The need for a progressive decrease until total elimination of production quotas in assembly factories;

4) Improvement of work conditions and respect for workers’ persons;

5) Impunity in the work arena: bosses have the Ministry of the Social Affaires or the Work Tribunal’s complicity in hindering workers legal rights;

6) Sexual harassment;

7) Generalized despotism in the work arena;

8) Lay-offs, illegal suspensions and all shapes of arbitrary of which workers are the victims;

9) Workers awareness on the need for a new Labor Code and the absence of a social security plan in Haiti, as well as the dubious practices of State institutions such as the old age office (ONA);

10) Necessary reforms within the Social Affairs Ministry but also our support to the civil servants in their struggle against the application of the structural adjustment program imposed by international financial institutions to our country;

11) Police repression and that carried out by elected local officials such the C.a.s.e.c. (Village Administration Councils) as well as certain employees of the Labor Ministry against peasant organization members;

12) Economic or political measures that don't allow for a real and sustained development of our natural and human resources;

13) The need for of another type of state capable of putting workers’ and popular masses’ interests foremost.

Batay Ouvriye intervenes on all these points by distributing fliers, booklets and bulletins, organizing press conferences, sending press releases, distributing or pasting posters in the industrial zones and districts where workers reside. Also, we hold pickets at factories entries, in front of the Ministry of the Social Affaires to force them to hear our demands concerning the numerous problems we face.

We wage a continuous struggle for a real change in our life and work conditions, as workers of Port-au-Prince, the high Artibonite, the low Central Plateau and the North, as well as specific struggles throughout the entire country around problems emerging from our daily lives. This, also, through campaigns: for day laborers wage hikes in the agricultural sector; their right to organize; the decrease of the production quotas in the textile factories; the respect of the rights of workers who have home responsibilities...

Thanks to these practices and despite the difficulties resulting from the effect of high interests at stake in the Haitian social formation, we have been able to establish many unions and committees within factories, hotels, stores or small workshops, as well as associations of small craftsmen and teachers in urban zones and farmer and agricultural workers organizations in rural areas.

This work of organization also gives us the opportunity to address the young, sons and girls of workers with whom we are in touch. We are engaged in the construction of a youth movement determined by the development of their struggles to satisfy their demands. At the same time, we address their parents and teachers. This has allowed us to build a coalition between workers’ organizations, pupils organizations and teachers’ organizations addressing the questions of education and teaching from the viewpoint of the working class and workers in general.

Our work with youth is centered on three major axes: their concrete struggles, development of skills and instructive leisure. In the framework of some of these activities, these workers’ sons and daughters are learning the first notions of data processing and electricity, kitchen and pastry...This development walks hand in hand with the setting up of a library including school books and references and the publication of a youngsters newspaper, amongst others.

Batay Ouvriye, consequently, articulates workplace struggles with those generally concerning the changes necessary in workers’ daily lives, against the various shapes of oppression that stake out their existence.

References

External links

 Batay Ouvriye official site

Main Site
 http://www.batayouvriye.org/English/Who.html

On Alleged Controversy
 http://www.batayouvriye.org/English/Positions1/smokinggun.html
 http://www.batayouvriye.org/English/Positions1/clarificationithp.html

Trade unions in Haiti